Furio Fusi (born 4 December 1947) is an Italian former sprinter who competed in the 1968 Summer Olympics.

Olympic results

National titles
1 win in 400 metres at the Italian Athletics Championships (1970)

See also
 Italy national relay team

References

External links
 

1947 births
Living people
Italian male sprinters
Olympic athletes of Italy
Athletes (track and field) at the 1968 Summer Olympics
Mediterranean Games gold medalists for Italy
Athletes (track and field) at the 1967 Mediterranean Games
Mediterranean Games medalists in athletics
Italian Athletics Championships winners
20th-century Italian people